Fernando Lopes Pereira (born ), known as Careca, is a Brazilian futsal player who plays as a goalkeeper for Atlântico and the Brazilian national futsal team.

References

External links
Liga Nacional de Futsal profile
The Final Ball profile

1989 births
Living people
Futsal goalkeepers
Brazilian men's futsal players